Tal El (lit. God's Dew) is a community settlement in northern Israel. Located in the Galilee between Acre and Karmiel, it falls under the jurisdiction of Misgav Regional Council.

History
The village was established in 1980 by ten families from the Soviet Union and two from Israel. The name was chosen because the tribe of Asher, who lived in this area, and the whole of Israel were blessed with dew from heaven. (Deuteronomy 33:24-28)

References

Community settlements
Populated places established in 1980
Populated places in Northern District (Israel)
1980 establishments in Israel
Russian-Jewish culture in Israel